Henneberger can refer to :

Barbara Henneberger (October 4, 1940 – April 12, 1964) was a German alpine skier. 
Moriz Henneberger (16 October 1878, Basel – 7 April 1959, Basel) was a Swiss chess master.
Walter Henneberger (19 May 1883, Ennenda – 15 January 1969, Zurich) was a Swiss chess master.

See also: Hennenberger, Hennenberg, Henneberg (disambiguation)